Greg Moffatt (born 8 January 1964) is an English footballer, who played as a defender in the Football League for Chester.

References

Chester City F.C. players
Olympiakos Nicosia players
Association football defenders
English Football League players
Expatriate footballers in Cyprus
1964 births
Living people
Footballers from Liverpool
English footballers
English expatriate footballers